Peach Blossoms were a candy made by Necco at The New England Confectionery Co. in Revere, Massachusetts. They contained peanut butter wrapped in a crunchy shell. Contrary to their name and color, the flavor did not imitate that of a peach. They were made with sugar, corn syrup, ground peanuts, salt, glycerine, vanillin and artificial coloring.

The candy was one of the company's brands placed on auction in 2018, but no potential buyer came forward.

See also
 List of peanut dishes

References
 

Necco brands
Companies that filed for Chapter 11 bankruptcy in 2018